Arterial Spray & Cattle Mutilations is the fourth and final studio album by Alien Faktor, released on 4 November 1997 by Decibel.

Reception
Larry Miles of Black Monday was somewhat positive in his reception of Arterial Spray & Cattle Mutilations, saying "there is a anthemic quality to arterial spray, but this becomes lost in danceable repetitiveness of textures and abhorrent lyrics found throughout." Andrew Lewandowski of Chronicles of Chaos awarded the album seven out of ten and called it "a harshly disturbing jaunt through the abysses which separate one synapse from another in a mind tormented by neurosis and psychosis." Chris Best of Lollipop Magazine praised the mainstream direction the band embraced. A critic for Sonic Boom gave the album a positive review and said "for the first time Alien Faktor has a musically cohesive release so listeners no longer have to endure a sometimes jarring genre change between tracks."

Track listing

Accolades

Personnel
Adapted from the Arterial Spray & Cattle Mutilations liner notes.

Alien Faktor
 Mike Hunsberger – guitar, programming
 Tom Muschitz – vocals, programming, production, engineering, mixing, mastering, design

Additional musicians
 Chris Randall – vocals and programming (3)
 Brian Sarche – guitar (3)
 Scott Sturgis – programming (6)

Production and design
 James Barany – painting
 Lars Hansen – assistant vocal engineering
 Bob Ross – design
 Karl Schlei – photography

Release history

References

External links 
 Arterial Spray & Cattle Mutilations at Discogs (list of releases)

1997 albums
Alien Faktor albums
Decibel (record label) albums